Scott Rasmussen (born 18 November 1978) is a New Zealand cricketer. He played in six first-class and twelve List A matches for Wellington from 2005 to 2007.

See also
 List of Wellington representative cricketers

References

External links
 

1978 births
Living people
New Zealand cricketers
Wellington cricketers
Cricketers from Wellington City